"Lonely" is a song written by Sharon Sheeley and recorded by Eddie Cochran. It was recorded in May 1958 and released posthumously as a single on Liberty F-55278 in August 1960. In the UK the single rose to number 41 on the charts. The U.S. release did not chart. The flip side, "Sweetie Pie", reached number 38 on the UK Singles chart.

Personnel
 Eddie Cochran: vocal, guitar
 Conrad 'Guybo' Smith: electric bass
 Unidentified: drums

Chart performance

Notes

External links

Eddie Cochran US discography

Eddie Cochran songs
Songs written by Sharon Sheeley
Liberty Records singles
1960 singles
1958 songs